Molina Point is the eastern point of Lemaire Island, off the Danco Coast of Graham Land, Antarctica. It was named "Punta Molina" by the Chilean Antarctic Expedition of 1950–51, possibly after a member of the expedition.

References

Headlands of Graham Land
Danco Coast